John Charles Hora (February 16, 1940 – February 9, 2021) was an American cinematographer and actor who was active from the 1970s to the 2000s.

Career
Hora worked with director Joe Dante in numerous films, including The Howling in 1981, Twilight Zone: The Movie in 1983, Gremlins in 1984 and its 1990 sequel, Gremlins 2: The New Batch, Explorers in 1985, and Matinee in 1993. He also served as a cinematographer for Michael Jackson's 1988 film Moonwalker and for the pilot for the television series Eerie, Indiana.

As an actor, Hora performed in Dante's film Innerspace (1987). He later appeared in Honey, I Blew Up the Kid (1992), the sequel to Honey, I Shrunk the Kids. Hora also worked as the director of photography for Honey, I Blew Up the Kid.

Later, Hora worked for The Los Angeles Film School and as secretary for the American Society of Cinematographers. In May 2005 he was honored by the magazine American Cinematographer.

Hora died from heart failure on February 9, 2021, a week before his 81st birthday.

Filmography

References

External links
 

1940 births
2021 deaths
American cinematographers
Place of death missing